Young Girl on a Chair is a 1955 bronze sculpture by Giacomo Manzù, installed at the Hirshhorn Museum and Sculpture Garden in Washington, D.C. The work measures  and depicts a nude young girl with her arms rested in her lap.

See also
 List of public art in Washington, D.C., Ward 2
 Self-Portrait with Model at Bergamo, another sculpture by Manzù at the Hirshhorn Museum and Sculpture Garden

References

1955 sculptures
Art in Washington, D.C.
Bronze sculptures in Washington, D.C.
Hirshhorn Museum and Sculpture Garden
Outdoor sculptures in Washington, D.C.
Sculptures of the Smithsonian Institution
Sculptures of women in Washington, D.C.